Fencing at the 2019 Military World Games was held in Wuhan, China from 19 to 24 October 2019.

Medal summary

Men

Women

Medal table

References

External links
Fencing at the 7th Military World Games 
Results book

Fencing
2019
2019
Military World Games